Cissé is a common West African name of Soninke origin, and the meaning of Cissé is the white horse in the same language. 
.

Notable people with the surname include:

Sports 
 Abdoulaye Cissé (b. 1983), Burkinabé footballer
 Aboubacar Cissé (b. 1969), Ivorian footballer
 Aliou Cissé (b. 1976), Senegalese footballer and coach
 Amadou Cissé (b. 1985), French-Guinean footballer
 Babacar Cissé (b. 1975), Senegalese basketball player
 Brahima Cissé (b. 1976), Burkinabé footballer
 Djibril Cissé (b. 1981), French footballer
 Édouard Cissé (b. 1978), French footballer
 Fousseyni Cissé (b. 1989), French footballer
 Ibrahima Cissé (b. 1994), Belgian-Guinean footballer
 Kalifa Cissé (b. 1984), Malian footballer
 Mangué Cissé (1945–2009), Ivorian footballer
 Mohamed Cissé (b. 1982), Guinean footballer
 Morlaye Cissé (b. 1983), Guinean footballer
 Ousmane Cissé (b. 1982), Malian basketball player
 Papiss Cissé (b. 1985), Senegalese footballer
 Salim Cissé (b. 1992), Guinean footballer
 Sekou Cissé (b. 1985), Ivorian footballer

Other
 Abdoulkader Cissé (b. 1955) Burkinabé politician
 Amadou Cissé (b. 1948), Nigerien politician, former Prime Minister of Niger (1995; 1996–97)
 Boubou Cissé, Malian politician
 Inna Sissoko Cissé, Malian government official
 Madjiguène Cissé (b. 1951), Senegalese activist
 Shaykh Hassan Cissé (1945-2008), Senegalese Islamic scholar
 Souleymane Cissé (b. 1940), Malian film director
 Soumaïla Cissé (b. 1949), Malian politician

See also
 Cisse (disambiguation)
 Ceesay (spelling variant of the same surname)
 Cissé, Vienne, a French commune

References

Mandinka surnames